The tumor necrosis factor (TNF) superfamily is a protein superfamily of type II transmembrane proteins containing TNF homology domain and forming trimers. Members of this superfamily can be released from the cell membrane by extracellular proteolytic cleavage and function as a cytokine. These proteins are expressed predominantly by immune cells and they regulate diverse cell functions, including immune response and inflammation, but also proliferation, differentiation, apoptosis and embryogenesis. 

The superfamily contains 19 members that bind to 29 members of TNF receptor superfamily. An occurrence of orthologs in invertebrates hints at ancient origin of this superfamily in evolution.

The PROSITE pattern of this superfamily is located in a beta sheet in the central section of the protein that is conserved across all members.

Members
There are 19 family members, numerically classified as TNFSF#, where # denotes the member number, sometimes followed by a letter.

References

External links 
 
 pex1 tumor necrosis factor gene

Cytokines
Protein superfamilies
Single-pass transmembrane proteins
TNF receptor family